Fraktur is a calligraphic hand of the Latin alphabet and any of several blackletter typefaces derived from this hand. Letters are designed such that the individual strokes are broken apart; in this way it is often contrasted with  the curves of the Antiqua (common) typefaces where the letters are designed to flow and strokes connect together in a continuous fashion.

Fraktur was often characterised as "the German typeface" because it remained popular in Germany and Eastern Europe for rather longer than elsewhere. In Germany, transition to more modern typefaces was controversial until 1941 when use of Fraktur typefaces was ended by (Nazi) government order. In non-professional contexts, the term "Fraktur" is sometimes (mis)applied to all of the blackletter typefaces. (The term "Gothic" is also sometimes used this way, although in typography the term "Gothic" means sans-serif.)

Characteristics
Some Fraktur typefaces also include a variant form of the letter r known as the r rotunda, and many include a variety of ligatures which are left over from cursive handwriting and have rules for their use.

One difference between the Fraktur and other blackletter scripts is that in the lower case , the left part of the bow is broken, but the right part is not. In Danish texts composed in Fraktur, the letter  was already preferred to the German and Swedish  in the 16th century.

In the Latvian variant of Fraktur, used mainly until the 1920s, there are additional characters used to denote Latvian letters with diacritical marks.

Origin
The first Fraktur typeface arose in the early 16th century, when Emperor Maximilian I commissioned the design of the Triumphal Arch woodcut by Albrecht Dürer and had a new typeface created specifically for this purpose, designed by Hieronymus Andreae. Fraktur types for printing were established by the Augsburg publisher Johann Schönsperger at the issuance of a series of Maximilian's works such as his Prayer Book (1513) or the illustrated Theuerdank poem (1517).

Fraktur quickly overtook the earlier Schwabacher and Textualis typefaces in popularity, and a wide variety of Fraktur fonts were carved and became common in the German-speaking world and areas under German influence (Scandinavia, Estonia, Latvia, Central Europe). In the 18th century, the German Theuerdank Fraktur was further developed by the Leipzig typographer Johann Gottlob Immanuel Breitkopf to create the typeset Breitkopf Fraktur. While over the succeeding centuries, most Central Europeans switched to Antiqua, German speakers remained a notable holdout.

Use

Typesetting in Fraktur was still very common in the early 20th century in all German-speaking countries and areas, as well as in Norway, Estonia, and Latvia, and was still used to a very small extent in Sweden, Finland and Denmark, even though other countries typeset in Antiqua. Some books at that time used related blackletter fonts such as Schwabacher; however, the predominant typeface was the Normalfraktur, which came in slight variations.

From the late 18th century to the late 19th century, Fraktur was progressively replaced by Antiqua as a symbol of the classicist age and emerging cosmopolitanism in most of the countries in Europe that had previously used Fraktur. This move was hotly debated in Germany, where it was known as the Antiqua–Fraktur dispute. The shift affected mostly scientific writing in Germany, whereas most belletristic literature and newspapers continued to be printed in Fraktur.

The Fraktur typefaces remained in use in Nazi Germany, when they were initially represented as true German script; official Nazi documents and letterheads employed the font, and the cover of Hitler's  used a hand-drawn version of it. However, more modernized fonts of the  type such as Tannenberg were in fact the most popular typefaces in Nazi Germany, especially for running text as opposed to decorative uses such as in titles. These fonts were designed in the early 20th century, mainly the 1930s, as grotesque versions of blackletter typefaces. The Nazis heavily used these fonts themselves, though the shift remained controversial; in fact, the press was at times scolded for its frequent use of "Roman characters" under "Jewish influence" and German émigrés were urged to use only "German script". On January 3, 1941, the Nazi Party ended this controversy by switching to international scripts such as Antiqua. Martin Bormann issued a circular (the "normal type decree") to all public offices which declared Fraktur (and its corollary, the -based handwriting) to be  (Jewish letters) and prohibited their further use. German historian Albert Kapr has speculated that the regime viewed Fraktur as inhibiting communication in the occupied territories during World War II.

After 1941

Even with the abolition of Fraktur, some publications include elements of it in headlines. However, academic works occasionally continued to use Fraktur in the text itself. Notably, Joachim Jeremias's work  ("The Letters to Timothy and Titus") was published in 1963 using Fraktur. More often, some ligatures ch, ck from Fraktur were used in antiqua-typed editions up to the offset type period. Fraktur saw a brief resurgence after the war, but thereafter fell out of common use.

In this modern decorative use, the traditional rules about the use of long s and short s and of ligatures are often disregarded.

Individual Fraktur letters are sometimes used in mathematics, which often denotes associated or parallel concepts by the same letter in different fonts. The Fraktur  is also sometimes used to denote the cardinality of the continuum, that is, the cardinality of the real line. In model theory,  is used to denote an arbitrary model, with A as its universe. Fraktur is also used in other ways at the discretion of the author.

Fraktur is still used among traditional Anabaptists to print German texts, while Kurrent is used as hand writing for German texts. Groups that use both forms of traditional German script are the Amish, Old Order Mennonites, Hutterites, and traditional Plautdietsch-speaking Mennonites who live mostly in Latin America today.

Typeface samples

In the figures below, the German sentence that appears after the names of the fonts (Walbaum-Fraktur in Fig. 1 and Humboldtfraktur in Fig. 2 reads, . It means "Victor chases twelve boxers across the Sylt dike" and contains all 26 letters of the alphabet plus the umlauted glyphs used in German, making it an example of a pangram.

Unicode
Unicode does not encode Fraktur as a separate script. Instead, Fraktur is considered a "presentation form" of the Latin alphabet. Thus, the additional ligatures that are required for Fraktur typefaces will not be encoded in Unicode: support for these ligatures is a font engineering issue left up to font developers.

There are, however, two sets of "Fraktur" symbols in the Unicode blocks of Mathematical Alphanumeric Symbols, Letterlike Symbols, and Latin Extended-E. The long s, ß, and the umlauted vowels are not encoded, as the characters are meant to be used in mathematics and phonetics, so they are not suitable for typesetting German-language texts.

 𝔄 𝔅 ℭ 𝔇 𝔈 𝔉 𝔊 ℌ ℑ 𝔍 𝔎 𝔏 𝔐 𝔑 𝔒 𝔓 𝔔 ℜ 𝔖 𝔗 𝔘 𝔙 𝔚 𝔛 𝔜 ℨ
 𝔞 𝔟 𝔠 𝔡 𝔢 𝔣 𝔤 𝔥 𝔦 𝔧 𝔨 𝔩 𝔪 𝔫 𝔬 𝔭 𝔮 𝔯 𝔰 𝔱 𝔲 𝔳 𝔴 𝔵 𝔶 𝔷
 𝕬 𝕭 𝕮 𝕯 𝕰 𝕱 𝕲 𝕳 𝕴 𝕵 𝕶 𝕷 𝕸 𝕹 𝕺 𝕻 𝕼 𝕽 𝕾 𝕿 𝖀 𝖁 𝖂 𝖃 𝖄 𝖅
 𝖆 𝖇 𝖈 𝖉 𝖊 𝖋 𝖌 𝖍 𝖎 𝖏 𝖐 𝖑 𝖒 𝖓 𝖔 𝖕 𝖖 𝖗 𝖘 𝖙 𝖚 𝖛 𝖜 𝖝 𝖞 𝖟

See also

 
 
 
 
  (letter ß)

Notes

References

Further reading
 Bain, Peter and Paul Shaw. Blackletter: Type and National Identity. Princeton Architectural Press: 1998. .
 Silvia Hartmann: Fraktur oder Antiqua. Der Schriftstreit von 1881 bis 1941, Peter Lang, Frankfurt am Main u. a. 1998 (2. üb. A. 1999), 
 Fiedl, Frederich, Nicholas Ott and Bernard Stein. Typography: An Encyclopedic Survey of Type Design and Techniques Through History. Black Dog & Leventhal: 1998. .
 Macmillan, Neil. An A–Z of Type Designers. Yale University Press: 2006. .

External links

 A complete Fraktur chart (Library of Yale University)
 UniFraktur: Free Fraktur fonts and resources at SourceForge
 Translating newspapers set in Fraktur (familyhistoryfanatics)

Blackletter
Blackletter typefaces
Latin script
German orthography
16th-century introductions
1941 disestablishments in Germany